McLogan is a surname. Notable people with the surname include:

Edwin C. McLogan (1889–1949), American politician
Jennifer McLogan (born 1953), American television journalist
Paddy McLogan (1899–1964), Irish republican and politician

See also
McLagan